Thomas "Darby" Ryan (12 January 1864 – 21 February 1927) was a New Zealand rugby union player, artist and lake steamer captain.

Early life and family
Born in London, England, on 12 January 1864, Ryan was the son of Mary Ryan and Charles Aldworth. He emigrated with his mother to New Zealand in about 1865, settling in Auckland, and was educated at the Church of England Grammar School, Parnell. In 1903 he married Mary Faith Murray, daughter of Ngāpuhi leader Kamareira Te Hautakiri Wharepapa, at Auckland.

Rugby union
A wing three-quarter, Ryan represented  at a provincial level, and captained the side in 1886. He was a member of the first New Zealand national side in 1884. He became the first player to kick a conversion and drop goal for New Zealand. He toured New South Wales in 1884 and played in all eight matches. In all, he played nine matches for New Zealand and scored 35 points. He did not play any full internationals as New Zealand did not play its first Test match until 1903.

Later, while studying in Paris in 1893, he refereed the French club final.

Artist
An accomplished artist, Ryan studied at the Académie Julian in Paris between 1892 and 1893. He worked mainly in watercolours and was known for his landscapes, seascapes and portraits of Māori. He exhibited at the Auckland Society of Arts over 36 years, and at the 1889 New Zealand and South Seas Exhibition in Dunedin. Three of his works—Champagne Falls, Wairapa Gorge (1891); Interior of a Whare ( 1891); and Sunset, Ngauruhoe Volcano (1905)—are in the collection of the Auckland Art Gallery.

A friend of Charles Goldie, Ryan assisted Goldie with introductions to Māori. Illustrated articles by Ryan were published in New Zealand Graphic.

Mariner
Ryan obtained his master mariner's certificate in 1900, and soon set up the first launch services for the public on Lakes Rotorua and Taupo. Between 1900 and 1909 he part-owned the SS Tongaririo, which ran between Taupo and Tokaanu, and was its captain from 1900 to about 1920.

Later life and death
About 1920, Ryan took up a farm at Whangapara on Great Barrier Island. On 21 February 1927 he died in Parnell, Auckland. He was buried at Purewa Cemetery.

References

1864 births
1927 deaths
Rugby union players from London
English emigrants to New Zealand
New Zealand rugby union players
New Zealand international rugby union players
Auckland rugby union players
Rugby union wings
New Zealand rugby union referees
New Zealand expatriates in France
Académie Julian alumni
New Zealand artists
New Zealand sailors
Burials at Purewa Cemetery